Johnny Doyle is a Gaelic footballer who plays for Allenwood and, formerly, at senior level for the Kildare county team.

Playing career
Doyle has won one Agricultural Colleges All-Ireland. His talents are very versatile and he has won an All-Ireland Cross Country Athletic College medal and won several boxing medals. Doyle also more recently has taken up a managerial role with the Maynooth Sigerson first team.

Club
Doyle plays his club football for Allenwood and was awarded Kildare Footballer of the Year in 2004 and 2005. He won the Kildare Senior Football Championship with Allenwood in 2004. Doyle and Allenwood's form continued in 2006 with a Kildare Senior Football Championship final appearance against Moorefield.

He did not miss a championship match for his club between his debut in 1995 and 2022 (when he had an injury) and started every championship match for his club between 2000 and 2013.

Inter-county
Doyle won one Leinster Senior Football Championship medal with Kildare in 2000 and a Kildare Under-21 county title. He was all round top scorer in the 2008 and 2010 Championships. Doyle was named as a 2010 Vodafone GAA football All Star for his performances with Kildare in the 2010 Championship. In 2012 Doyle captained Kildare to the National Football League Division 2 title with a win over Tyrone. In 2012 and 2013 he was on the Kildare team to win the O'Byrne Cup. Doyle announced his retirement from inter-county football on 6 April 2014, at the age of 36. On his retirement Doyle had appeared 154 times for his county over a 15-year span.

In 2019, at the age of 41, he made a surprise return to the inter-county game when he joined the Kildare junior team.

International rules
Doyle was called up for the 2013 International Rules Series as a replacement for Aidan O'Shea ahead of the second Test. He played for Ireland against Australia at Croke Park and won the Series.

Career statistics
 As of 6 April 2014

Honours
Inter-county
 1 Leinster Senior Football Championship (2000)
 1 National Football League Division 2 (2012 [c])

International
 1 International Rules Series (2013)

Club
 2 Kildare Senior Football League Division 1s (2002, 2004)
 1 Kildare Senior Football Championship (2004)

Individual
 4 Kildare Senior Player of the Years (2004, 2005, 2008, 2010)
 1 All Stars Award (2010)

References

1977 births
Living people
Allenwood Gaelic footballers
Gaelic football forwards
Irish international rules football players
Kildare inter-county Gaelic footballers